The Seamen and Waterfront Workers Trade Union is a trade union in Trinidad and Tobago. Its historical base was the port but this has shrunk in significance over the years. It retains a dock and seafarers membership but has expanded into organising local factories such as National Flour Mills (NFM) and the West Indian Tobacco Company (WITCO), a cigarette making company.

See also

 List of trade unions

Trade unions in Trinidad and Tobago
Maritime trade unions